Lechriolepis is a genus of moths in the family Lasiocampidae. The genus was erected by Arthur Gardiner Butler in 1880.

Species
Some species of this genus are:
Lechriolepis anomala Butler, 1880
Lechriolepis basirufa Strand, 1912
Lechriolepis citrina (Schaus, 1897) 
Lechriolepis cryptognoma Tams, 1931
Lechriolepis dewitzi Aurivillius, 1927
Lechriolepis diabolus Hering, 1928
Lechriolepis flaveola (Bethune-Baker, 1911)
Lechriolepis flavomarginata Aurivillius, 1927
Lechriolepis fulvipuncta Viette, 1962
Lechriolepis griseola Aurivillius, 1927
Lechriolepis gyldenstolpei Aurivillius, 1927
Lechriolepis heres (Schaus, 1893) 
Lechriolepis jacksoni (Bethune-Baker, 1911)
Lechriolepis johannae De Lajonquière, 1969
Lechriolepis leopoldi Hering, 1929
Lechriolepis leucostigma (Hampson, 1909)
Lechriolepis nephopyropa Tams, 1931
Lechriolepis nigrivenis Strand, 1912
Lechriolepis ochraceola Strand, 1912 
Lechriolepis pratti (Kenrick, 1914)
Lechriolepis pulchra Aurivillius, 1905 
Lechriolepis ramdimby Viette, 1962
Lechriolepis rotunda Strand, 1912
Lechriolepis stumpffii (Saalmüller, 1878)
Lechriolepis tamsi Talbot, 1927
Lechriolepis tapiae De Lajonquière, 1969
Lechriolepis tessmanni Strand, 1912 
Lechriolepis varia (Walker, 1855)

References

Lasiocampidae